Teresa Miller may refer to:

 Teresa Miller (lawyer), current Insurance Commissioner of Pennsylvania
 Teresa Miller (academic), American professor, author, legal scholar, and educator
 Teresa Miller (writer), American writer, television host, and literary activist
 Teresa K. Miller, American poet